The Ocean Springs School District is a public school district based in Ocean Springs, Mississippi (USA). In 2019, 2020, & 2021, the Mississippi Department of Education ranked it as the #2 performing district in the state of Mississippi.

In addition to Ocean Springs, the district also serves the Gulf Park Estates community and a small section of Gautier.

Schools

High School (Grades 9-12)
Ocean Springs High School

Middle School (Grades 7-8)
Ocean Springs Middle School

Upper Elementary School (Grades 4-6)
Ocean Springs Upper Elementary

Elementary Schools (Grades PreK-3)
Magnolia Park Elementary (Grades K-3)
Oak Park Elementary (Grades PreK-3)
Pecan Park Elementary (Grades K-3)

District Campuses
Ocean Springs Career and Technical Education Center
Elizabeth H. Keys Alternative Education Center

Demographics

2019-20 school year
There were a total of 6,036 students enrolled in the Ocean Springs School District during the 2019–2020 school year.

Previous school years

Accountability statistics

See also
List of school districts in Mississippi

References

External links
 

Education in Jackson County, Mississippi
School districts in Mississippi
School districts established in 1927